Gimpel is a surname derived from the pet name of the German name  Gumprecht. 

Notable people with the surname include:

 Bronislav Gimpel (1911–1979), Polish-American violinist
 Erica Gimpel (born 1964), American television actress
 Erich Gimpel (1910–1996), German spy during World War II
Harald Gimpel, East German slalom canoeist 
 Jakob Gimpel (1906–1989), Polish-American pianist
 Jean Gimpel (1918–1996) French historian, medievalist and iconoclast
Jeremy Gimpel, Israeli educator and politician 
 René Gimpel (1881–1945) French art dealer and collector

See also

Gimpl

References

German-language surnames